Institute of Physics and Technology (IPT) is one of leading institutions of Ural Federal University. IPT was transformed from Physical Engineering faculty of USTU-UPI during merging USTU-UPI and USU. The institute trains specialists in the following fields: physico-chemical, physical engineering, IT, social and humanitarian, quality management of innovative products and technologies. IPT also known as "UPI's Phystech"().

History 
The Physical Engineering faculty of USTU-UPI was established May 27, 1949 in order to prepare personnel for the nuclear industry. Originally known as Engineering Physics Faculty, it was renamed to the Physical Engineering faculty in autumn of 1949. The first graduates (students transferred from the Power Engineering Faculty in 1949) in December 1950.

1953 - a dormitory faculty was built (10th student housing)
1956 - its own faculty building  (5th academic building).

For 60 years Phystech produced more than 12,000 engineers, some of whom are directors of nuclear power plants and research institutions, university presidents, members of the Academy of Sciences of the USSR and the Russian Academy of Sciences, academicians.

Deans of the faculty 
Krylov Evgenii Ivanovich (1949–1956)
Vlasov Vasily Grigorievich (1956–1958)
Derjaguin Pavel Ilyich (1958–1960)
Raspopin Sergei Pavlovich (1960–1962)
Skripov Vladimir Pavlovich (1962–1964)
Dmitriev, Ivan Aleksandrovich (1964–1970)
Suetin Parigory Evstafievich (1970–1976)
Egorov Yuri Vyacheslavovich (1976–1986)
Beketov Askold Rafailovich (1986–2004)
Rychkov Vladimir Nikolayevich (dean since 2004, director 2011-2019)
Ivanov Vladimir Yurievich (2020-)

Departments 
Physical and Chemical Methods of Analysis
Radio Chemistry and Applied Ecology
Technical Physics
Theoretical Physics and Applied Mathematics
Experimental Physics
Physical Methods and Devices for Quality Control
Rare Metals and Nanomaterials
Innovative Technologies
Electrophysics
Informatics & Computer Engineering
Foreign Languages
Public Safety
Intellectual Property Management

See also 
Moscow Institute of Physics and Technology (MIPT)

References 

Ural Federal University